Dan is the general name for female roles in Chinese opera, often referring to leading roles. They may be played by male or female actors. In the early years of Peking opera, all  roles were played by men, but this practice is no longer common in any Chinese opera genre.

Male dan actors
Male actors who specialize in playing dan are referred to as nándàn (男旦); the practice arose during the Qing dynasty due to imperial prohibitions against women performing on stage, considered detrimental to public morality. This practice of female impersonation by male actors was led by Mei Lanfang, one of the most famous dan performer. In the early years of Peking opera, all  roles were played by men.

In the late Qing dynasty and the early republic, the performance of actresses became popular. As a result, women were playing increasingly important roles on stage. But Peking opera has been characterized by female impersonation for years, male dan actors were viewed as irreplaceable by female actors.

In Peking opera, the famous Dans are Mei Lanfang, Cheng Yanqiu, Shang Xiaoyun, and Xun Huisheng, all men. In Pingju, the "Four Big Famous Dans"  Sì Dàmíng Dàn) are Ai Lianjun, Bai Yushuang, Liu Cuixia, and Xi Cailian. There were also "Four Small Famous Dans" (四小名旦)  Li Shifang, Mao Shilai, Zhang Junqiu, and Song Dezhu.

Subtypes
There are a few different kinds of dan in Chinese opera. The commonly seen ones are 'Guimen Dan', 'Zheng Dan', 'Hua Dan', 'Daoma Dan', 'Wu Dan', 'Lao Dan' and 'Cai Dan'. Each different kind of dan has its own unique characteristics.

Guimen Dan
The Guimen Dan ("boudoir-door role") is the role of the virtuous lady. They are usually young and unmarried women that have high social status. Guimen Dan focus more on singing and they have little movement. They sing in a very high pitched and piercing voice. Opera schools in China have difficulty recruiting students for this kind of role, since it requires a good voice, good looks, and a good height. The most famous Guimen Dan of the last century was Mei Lanfang. Examples of Guimen roles are Du Liniang (杜丽娘) from The Peony Pavilion (牡丹亭) and Wang Baochuan (王宝钏）from Wujiapo  (武家坡).

Zheng Dan 
Zheng Dan ("straight role"), also known as Qingyi ("verdant-clad"), is the role of middle-aged women. The characters are mostly married, dignified and elegant women and are mainly the roles of wives and mothers. Similar to Guimen Dan, Qingyi's performance is characterized by singing and speeches, and the range of motion is relatively small. They are also required not to show their teeth and not move their dresses when they perform.

Hua Dan
A Hua Dan ("flowery role") is a lively, vivacious young female character. They normally wear short blouses with pants or skirts. Unlike the Guimen Dan, the Hua Dan focuses more on movements and speech. They must be able to speak quickly and clearly. They also need to project an image of cuteness and innocence as Hua Dan always represent girls of around 12–16 years old. Often, a Guimen Dan is accompanied by a Hua Dan maid. Hongniang of the Romance of the Western Chamber and Yan Xijiao (阎惜姣) of Wulongyuan (乌龙院) have involved the role of Hua Dan.

Daoma Dan
A Daoma Dan ("sword-and-horse role") is a young female warrior. The style of performance usually involves horseriding with a spear. This category is superficially similar to Wu Dan, but there is a difference. Daoma Dan does not fight as much as Wu Dan. They do more stunts and dancing with the spear or whatever weapons they have. Daoma Dan needs to sing, which is performed while dancing or doing stunts and requires great stamina. Daoma Dan usually wears female warrior costumes with the flags behind. Examples of Daoma Dan are Liang Hongyu and Mu Guiying.  Daoma Dan is also the original Chinese title of the 1986 Hong Kong film Peking Opera Blues, directed by Tsui Hark.

Wu Dan
The Wu Dan ("martial role") specializes in fighting with all kinds of weapons. The Wu Dan engages in fighting with opponents besides just doing stunts. In the past, the Wu Dan needed to perform cai qiao (踩跷), which the Daoma Dan did not do. Cai qiao is a very difficult skill requiring the actress to stand on tip toe throughout the whole show. The actress will wear something akin to high heels shoes, but the heels of this special kind of shoe are so high that the actress is practically standing on tip toe. Fake small shoes are then attached underneath so that it appears that the actress has very small feet. It is an imitation of the foot binding practice. Wu Dan must master many acrobatic movements. They specialize only in fighting hence they seldom sing or speak.  Examples of Wu Dan are Zhizhu Jing (蜘蛛精) of Pansidong (盘丝洞) and Hu Sanniang.

Lao Dan
The Lao Dan ("old role") are older women. They have their own set of movements and gestures and singing styles, distinguished against the Guimen Dan. The Guimen roles sing in high pitched and piercing voices while the Lao Dan sing in a lower pitched voice. Lao Dan costumes are also less vibrant compared to other female roles and they have much simpler hair styles.  An example is Dowager She of Yang Men Nu Jiang (杨门女将).

Cai Dan
The Cai Dan ("colorful role") is a clownish woman. Cai Dan do not act like normal Dan and they do clownish gestures. Their movements resemble normal daily movements and they speak in normal voices. Clownish dans are now normally performed by men; hence they are physically unattractive, which is exaggerated by their hideous make up.

Huashan
This role type integrates the artistic characteristics of Zheng Dan, Hua Dan, and Daoma Dan, and creates a more versatile dan role.

See also 

 Chinese opera
 Guzhuang (costume)

Notes

References

Citations

Bibliography
 .
 

Chinese opera role types
Female stock characters